Tied Down is the only official studio album by hardcore punk band Negative Approach.

Track listing

 "Tied Down" – 1:33
 "Hypocrite" – 1:47
 "Evacuate" – 2:35
 "Said and Done" – 0:50
 "Nothing" – 2:20
 "Your Mistake" – 1:48
 "Live Your Life" – 1:06
 "Friend or Foe" – 1:12
 "Dead Stop" – 2:41
 "I'll Survive" – 1:01

References

1983 albums
Negative Approach albums